Leo Clements (8 November 1907 – 30 July 1979) was an  Australian rules footballer who played with Hawthorn in the Victorian Football League (VFL).

Notes

External links 

1907 births
1979 deaths
Australian rules footballers from Victoria (Australia)
Hawthorn Football Club players
South Bendigo Football Club players